Roskelley is a surname. Notable people with the name include:

 John Roskelley (born 1948), American mountaineer and author
 Jess Roskelley (1982–2019), American mountaineer, son of John

See also
 Roskill (disambiguation)